The Bird-class patrol vessel was a class of large patrol boat built for the Royal Navy. There were five in total: Kingfisher, Cygnet, Peterel, Sandpiper and Redpole.

The class was designed for patrol and fishery protection tasks in coastal and inshore territorial waters. The first of the class were delivered some 18 months late, and the rest approximately two years late. 

The first four vessels of the class were ordered in late 1972 and commissioned between 1975 and 1977, with the final ship being commissioned in 1983 after a conversion by Fairmile Marine. They were built by Richard Dunston for £1.1m each, and were designed for service in the Inshore Division of the Fishery Protection Squadron. The class was closely related to the Royal Air Force Marine Branch Seal class]] long-range recovery boats. 

The vessels had poor seakeeping qualities and the design was therefore considered unsuccessful. As a result, Peterel and Sandpiper were employed as training tenders for the Royal Naval Reserve and never undertook an operational patrol. After a decision was made on their future, they were fitted with an enclosed bridge and assigned to Britannia Royal Naval College for training duties. Kingfisher, Redpole and Cygnet were assigned to Northern Ireland Squadron to replace the older s. 

The vessels are now privately owned, Cygnet in the UK, Redpole in the US and Sandpiper in the Netherlands.

References

 
Patrol boat classes
Patrol vessels of the Royal Navy
Ship classes of the Royal Navy